Siamion Mikalayevich Domash (2 January 1950 – 9 February 2019) was a Belarusian politician and trades unionist. He was Chairman of Grodno Region in 1994. He was registered to run in the 2001 Belarusian presidential election, but exited from the campaign, endorsing Vladimir Goncharik. He died of a heart attack in 2019.

References

External links
 Биография на People’s History

1950 births
2019 deaths
Belarusian politicians
Candidates for President of Belarus
People from Lyakhavichy District